The following lists events that happened during 1968 in New Zealand.

Population
 Estimated population as of 31 December: 2,773,000
 Increase since 31 December 1967: 28,000 (1.02%)
 Males per 100 females: 99.8 – This was the first year (other than during a major war) in which the number of females exceeded the number of males.

Incumbents

Regal and viceregal
Head of State – Elizabeth II
Governor-General – Sir Arthur Porritt Bt GCMG GCVO CBE.

Government
The 35th Parliament of New Zealand continued, with the National government in power.
Speaker of the House – Roy Jack.
Prime Minister – Keith Holyoake
Deputy Prime Minister – Jack Marshall.
Minister of Finance – Robert Muldoon.
Minister of Foreign Affairs – Keith Holyoake.
Attorney-General – Ralph Hanan.
Chief Justice — Sir Richard Wild

Parliamentary opposition 
 Leader of the Opposition –   Norman Kirk (Labour).
 Leader of the Social Credit Party – Vernon Cracknell

Main centre leaders
Mayor of Auckland – Roy McElroy then Dove-Myer Robinson
Mayor of Hamilton – Denis Rogers then Mike Minogue
Mayor of Wellington – Frank Kitts
Mayor of Christchurch – George Manning then Ron Guthrey
Mayor of Dunedin – Russell John Calvert then Jim Barnes

Events 
 10 April – Inter-Island ferry  foundered off Wellington with the loss of 53 lives.
 24 May – 1968 Inangahua earthquake
 14 October – NAC commences scheduled Boeing 737-200 operations between Auckland, Wellington, Christchurch and Dunedin.
 The Southland Daily News, which had been acquired by its rival The Southland Times in 1967, ceased publication and was replaced by an evening edition of The Times. The paper was first published as Southern News and Foveaux Strait's Herald in 1861.

Arts and literature
Ruth Dallas wins the Robert Burns Fellowship.

See 1968 in art, 1968 in literature, :Category:1968 books

Music

New Zealand Music Awards
Loxene Golden Disc  Allison Durbin – I Have Loved Me A Man

See: 1968 in music

Radio and television
Wellington television crews win the World Newsfilm Award for their coverage of the Wahine disaster.

See 1968 in television, List of TVNZ television programming, :Category:Television in New Zealand, :Category:New Zealand television shows, Public broadcasting in New Zealand

Film

See: :Category:1968 film awards, 1968 in film, List of New Zealand feature films, Cinema of New Zealand, :Category:1968 films

Sport

Athletics

 Jeff Julian wins his second national title in the men's marathon, clocking 2:22:40 on 9 March in Whangarei.

Association football
 The Chatham Cup is won by Eastern Suburbs of Auckland, who beat Christchurch Technical 2–0 in the final.
 1968 was the first year in which all three regional leagues operated, with the formation of the Southern League.
 Northern League premier division (Thompson Shield) won by Mt Wellington.
 Central League  won by Western Suburbs FC
 Southern League First Division won by Christchurch City AFC

Chess
 The 75th National Chess Championship was held in Dunedin, and was won by B.R. Anderson of Christchurch.

Cricket
 Indian cricket team in New Zealand in 1967–68. The first Test was India's first win away from home, and the second Test was New Zealand's first victory over India.

Horse racing

Harness racing
 New Zealand Trotting Cup: Humphrey
 Auckland Trotting Cup: Cardinal Garrison

Motorsport
 The 1968 Tasman Series was won by Jim Clark
 The 15th 1968 New Zealand Grand Prix was won by Chris Amon

Olympic Games

Summer Olympics

 New Zealand sends a team of 52 competitors.

Winter Olympics

 New Zealand competes at the Winter Olympics for only the third time, with a team of six athletes.

Paralympic Games

Summer Paralympics

 New Zealand sends a team to the Paralympics for the first time.

Rugby league
 New Zealand competed in the 1968 Rugby League World Cup, losing all its 3 games to finish in last place.

Rugby union
 The national team of France toured New Zealand, losing all three tests and one of their nine provincial matches.

Births
 26 January: Chris Pringle, cricketer.
 January: Emma Paki, singer/songwriter.
 29 February: Gareth Farr, composer and percussionist.
 20 March: Lawrence Makoare, actor.
 29 March: Lucy Lawless, actress and singer.
 16 April (in England): Roger Twose, cricketer.
 10 May: Craig Russ, field hockey player.
 14 May (in Canada): Richard Tapper, swimmer.
 25 May: Kevin Iro, rugby league player.
 26 June: Scott Anderson, field hockey goalkeeper .
 8 July: Shane Howarth, rugby player.
 27 July: Cliff Curtis, actor.
 31 July: Jenny Duck, field hockey player .
 4 November: Lee Germon, cricketer.
 21 August: Robbie Johnston, long-distance runner.
 27 August: Matthew Ridge, rugby league player, rugby union player and television presenter.
 24 October (in Papua New Guinea): Ross Anderson, swimmer.
 18 November: Logan Edwards, rugby league player.
 3 December: Toni Jeffs, swimmer.
 15 December: Kirsa Jensen, missing person.
 25 December: Jason Mackie, rugby league player.
 Greg Johnson, musician.
 Paul Moon, historian and biographer.
 Michael Parekowhai, sculptor.
:Category:1968 births

Deaths
 4 June: Walter Nash, 27th Prime Minister of New Zealand.
 19 September: Barrett Crumen, seaman and swagger.
 19 November: Vivian Potter, politician.

See also
List of years in New Zealand
Timeline of New Zealand history
History of New Zealand
Military history of New Zealand
Timeline of the New Zealand environment
Timeline of New Zealand's links with Antarctica

References

External links

 
New Zealand
Years of the 20th century in New Zealand